Blue Suede Shoes: A Rockabilly Session was a televised concert that was taped live at Limehouse Studios in London, England on 21 October 1985. The show featured rock n' roll pioneer Carl Perkins along with friends as guest stars, including Eric Clapton, former Beatles George Harrison and Ringo Starr, Rosanne Cash, and Phantom, Rocker & Slick, as well as Dave Edmunds who acted as musical director for the show. Most of the repertoire performed in the concert consisted of Perkins' classic rockabilly songs from the 1950s. It was directed by Tom Gutteridge. The concert special was originally broadcast in 1985 on Channel 4 in the UK and on Cinemax in 1986 with introductory comments by Johnny Cash, Roy Orbison, and Jerry Lee Lewis. The show was shown on Channel 4 on 1 January 1986. Perkins performed 16 songs with two encores. Perkins and his friends ended the session by singing his most famous song, 30 years after its writing, which brought Perkins to tears. The concert is a memorable highlight of Carl Perkins' later career and has been highly praised by fans for the spirited performances delivered by Perkins and his famous guests. It was the first public performance by George Harrison in more than ten years.

Personnel
Carl Perkins (guitar, vocals)
Greg Perkins (bass guitar)
Lee Rocker (double bass)
Slim Jim Phantom (drums)
Earl Slick (guitar)
Dave Edmunds (guitar, vocals)
David Charles (drums)
John David (bass guitar)
Mickey Gee (guitar)
Geraint Watkins (piano)
Ringo Starr (drums, tambourine, vocals)
George Harrison (guitar, vocals)
Eric Clapton (guitar, vocals)
Rosanne Cash (vocals, maracas)

Track listing
All songs by Carl Perkins, except where noted:

 "Introduction"
 "Boppin' the Blues"
 "Put Your Cat Clothes On"
 "Honey Don't"
 "Matchbox"
 "Mean Woman Blues" (Claude Demetrius)
 "Turn Around"
 "Jackson" (Jerry Leiber, Billy Edd Wheeler)
 "What Kind of Girl" (Steve Forbert)
 "Everybody's Trying To Be My Baby"
 "Your True Love"
 "The World Is Waiting For The Sunrise "(Gene Lockhart, Ernest Seitz)
 "Medley": That's Alright Mama (Arthur Crudup) / Blue Moon of Kentucky (Bill Monroe) / Night Train to Memphis (Marvin Hughes, Beasley Smith, Owen Bradley) / Amen (Traditional)
 "Glad All Over"
 "Whole Lotta Shakin' Goin' On" (Sunny David [Roy Hall], Dave Williams)
 "Gone Gone Gone"
 "Blue Suede Shoes"
 "Blue Suede Shoes" (encore)
 "Gone Gone Gone" (encore)

References

1986 live albums
Carl Perkins albums